Neural network refers to interconnected populations of neurons or neuron simulations that form the structure and architecture of nervous systems, in animals, humans, and computing systems:
Artificial neural network, a computing system inspired by the biological neural networks found in animal brains
Biological neural network or neural circuit, a collection of physically interconnected neurons that carry out a specific function together
Large scale brain networks, biological neural networks on a larger scale
Convolutional neural network, a class of deep neural networks, most commonly applied to analyzing visual imagery
Deep neural network, an artificial neural network with multiple layers between the input and output layers

Neural networks may also refer to:
Neural Networks (journal), peer-reviewed scientific journal

See also
Neutral network (evolution)